West Virginia Route 86 is a north–south state highway located within Marshall County, West Virginia. The southern terminus of the route is at U.S. Route 250 and West Virginia Route 2 in Glen Dale. The northern terminus is at West Virginia Route 88 southeast of Benwood.

Major intersections

References

086
Transportation in Marshall County, West Virginia